Under Germany's mixed member proportional system of election, the Bundestag has 299 constituencies (electoral districts), each of which elects one member of the Bundestag by first-past-the-post voting (a plurality of votes). At least 299 more representatives are elected from closed lists in each of Germany's sixteen Länder, distributed in a manner that ensures that the overall proportion of representatives for each party is approximately equal to the proportion of votes its list received.

Voting was last held in Germany's constituencies on 27 September 2021, determining the members of the 20th Bundestag.

List of seats by Land

Baden-Württemberg
38 constituencies:

Stuttgart I
Stuttgart II
Böblingen
Esslingen
Nürtingen
Göppingen
Waiblingen
Ludwigsburg
Neckar-Zaber
Heilbronn
Schwäbisch Hall – Hohenlohe
Backnang – Schwäbisch Gmünd
Aalen – Heidenheim
Karlsruhe-Stadt
Karlsruhe-Land
Rastatt
Heidelberg
Mannheim
Odenwald – Tauber
Rhein-Neckar
Bruchsal – Schwetzingen
Pforzheim
Calw
Freiburg
Lörrach – Müllheim
Emmendingen – Lahr
Offenburg
Rottweil – Tuttlingen
Schwarzwald-Baar
Konstanz
Waldshut
Reutlingen
Tübingen
Ulm
Biberach
Bodensee
Ravensburg
Zollernalb – Sigmaringen

Bavaria
46 constituencies:

Altötting
Erding – Ebersberg
Freising
Fürstenfeldbruck
Ingolstadt
Munich North
Munich East
Munich South
Munich West/Central
München-Land
Rosenheim
Bad Tölz-Wolfratshausen – Miesbach
Starnberg – Landsberg
Traunstein
Weilheim
Deggendorf
Landshut
Passau
Rottal-Inn
Straubing
Amberg
Regensburg
Schwandorf
Weiden
Bamberg
Bayreuth
Coburg
Hof
Kulmbach
Ansbach
Erlangen
Fürth
Nuremberg North
Nuremberg South
Roth
Aschaffenburg
Bad Kissingen
Main-Spessart
Schweinfurt
Würzburg
Augsburg-Stadt
Augsburg-Land
Donau-Ries
Neu-Ulm
Oberallgäu
Ostallgäu

Berlin
12 constituencies:

 Berlin-Charlottenburg-Wilmersdorf
 Berlin-Friedrichshain-Kreuzberg – Prenzlauer Berg East
 Berlin-Lichtenberg
 Berlin-Marzahn-Hellersdorf
 Berlin-Mitte
 Berlin-Neukölln
 Berlin-Pankow
 Berlin-Reinickendorf
 Berlin-Spandau – Charlottenburg North
 Berlin-Steglitz-Zehlendorf
 Berlin-Tempelhof-Schöneberg
 Berlin-Treptow-Köpenick

Brandenburg
10 constituencies:

Prignitz – Ostprignitz-Ruppin – Havelland I
Uckermark – Barnim I
Oberhavel – Havelland II
Märkisch-Oderland – Barnim II
Brandenburg an der Havel – Potsdam-Mittelmark I – Havelland III – Teltow-Fläming I
Potsdam – Potsdam-Mittelmark II – Teltow-Fläming II
Dahme-Spreewald – Teltow-Fläming III – Oberspreewald-Lausitz I
Frankfurt (Oder) – Oder-Spree
Cottbus – Spree-Neiße
Elbe-Elster – Oberspreewald-Lausitz II

Bremen
2 constituencies:

Bremen I
Bremen II – Bremerhaven

Hamburg
6 constituencies:

 Hamburg-Altona
 Hamburg-Eimsbüttel
 Hamburg-Mitte
 Hamburg-Nord
 Hamburg-Wandsbek
 Hamburg-Bergedorf – Harburg

Hesse
22 constituencies:

Waldeck
Kassel
Werra-Meißner – Hersfeld-Rotenburg
Schwalm-Eder
Marburg
Lahn-Dill
Gießen
Fulda
Main-Kinzig – Wetterau II – Schotten
Hochtaunus
Wetterau I
Rheingau-Taunus – Limburg
Wiesbaden
Hanau
Main-Taunus
Frankfurt am Main I
Frankfurt am Main II
Groß-Gerau
Offenbach
Darmstadt
Odenwald
Bergstraße

Lower Saxony
30 constituencies:

Aurich – Emden
Unterems
Friesland – Wilhelmshaven – Wittmund
Oldenburg – Ammerland
Delmenhorst – Wesermarsch – Oldenburg-Land
Cuxhaven – Stade II
Stade I – Rotenburg II
Mittelems
Cloppenburg – Vechta
Diepholz – Nienburg I
Osterholz – Verden
Rotenburg I - Heidekreis
Harburg
Lüchow-Dannenberg – Lüneburg
Osnabrück-Land
Stadt Osnabrück
Nienburg II – Schaumburg
Stadt Hannover I
Stadt Hannover II
Hannover-Land I
Celle – Uelzen
Gifhorn – Peine
Hameln-Pyrmont – Holzminden
Hannover-Land II
Hildesheim
Salzgitter – Wolfenbüttel
Braunschweig
Helmstedt – Wolfsburg
Goslar – Northeim – Osterode
Göttingen

Mecklenburg-Vorpommern
6 constituencies:

Schwerin – Ludwigslust-Parchim I – Nordwestmecklenburg I
Ludwigslust-Parchim II – Nordwestmecklenburg II – Landkreis Rostock I
Rostock – Landkreis Rostock II
Vorpommern-Rügen – Vorpommern-Greifswald I
Mecklenburgische Seenplatte I – Vorpommern-Greifswald II
Mecklenburgische Seenplatte II – Landkreis Rostock III

North Rhine-Westphalia
64 constituencies:

Aachen I
Aachen II
Heinsberg
Düren
Rhein-Erft-Kreis I
Euskirchen – Rhein-Erft-Kreis II
Cologne I
Cologne II
Cologne III
Bonn
Rhein-Sieg-Kreis I
Rhein-Sieg-Kreis II
Oberbergischer Kreis
Rheinisch-Bergischer Kreis
Leverkusen - Cologne IV
Wuppertal I
Solingen – Remscheid – Wuppertal II
Mettmann I
Mettmann II
Düsseldorf I
Düsseldorf II
Neuss I
Mönchengladbach
Krefeld I – Neuss II
Viersen
Kleve
Wesel I
Krefeld II – Wesel II
Duisburg I
Duisburg II
Oberhausen – Wesel III
Mülheim – Essen I
Essen II
Essen III
Recklinghausen I
Recklinghausen II
Gelsenkirchen
Steinfurt I – Borken I
Bottrop – Recklinghausen III
Borken II
Coesfeld – Steinfurt II
Steinfurt III
Münster
Warendorf
Gütersloh I
Bielefeld – Gütersloh II
Herford – Minden-Lübbecke II
Minden-Lübbecke I
Lippe I
Höxter – Lippe II
Paderborn – Gütersloh III
Hagen – Ennepe-Ruhr-Kreis I
Ennepe-Ruhr-Kreis II
Bochum I
Herne – Bochum II
Dortmund I
Dortmund II
Unna I
Hamm – Unna II
Soest
Hochsauerlandkreis
Siegen-Wittgenstein
Olpe – Märkischer Kreis I
Märkischer Kreis II

Rhineland-Palatinate
15 constituencies:

Neuwied
Ahrweiler
Koblenz
Mosel/Rhein-Hunsrück
Kreuznach
Bitburg
Trier
Montabaur
Mainz
Worms
Ludwigshafen/Frankenthal
Neustadt – Speyer
Kaiserslautern
Pirmasens
Südpfalz

Saarland
4 constituencies:

Saarbrücken
Saarlouis
St. Wendel
Homburg

Saxony
16 constituencies:

Nordsachsen
Leipzig I
Leipzig II
Leipzig-Land
Meißen
Bautzen I
Görlitz
Sächsische Schweiz-Osterzgebirge
Dresden I
Dresden II – Bautzen II
Mittelsachsen
Chemnitz
Chemnitzer Umland – Erzgebirgskreis II
Erzgebirgskreis I
Zwickau
Vogtlandkreis

Saxony-Anhalt
9 constituencies:

Altmark
Börde – Jerichower Land
Harz
Magdeburg
Dessau – Wittenberg
Anhalt
Halle
Burgenland – Saalekreis
Mansfeld

Schleswig-Holstein
11 constituencies:

Flensburg – Schleswig
Nordfriesland – Dithmarschen Nord
Steinburg – Dithmarschen Süd
Rendsburg-Eckernförde
Kiel
Plön – Neumünster
Pinneberg
Segeberg – Stormarn-Mitte
Ostholstein – Stormarn-Nord
Herzogtum Lauenburg – Stormarn-Süd
Lübeck

Thuringia
8 constituencies:

Eichsfeld – Nordhausen – Kyffhäuserkreis
Eisenach – Wartburgkreis – Unstrut-Hainich-Kreis
Jena – Sömmerda – Weimarer Land I
Gotha – Ilm-Kreis
Erfurt – Weimar – Weimarer Land II
Gera – Greiz – Altenburger Land
Saalfeld-Rudolstadt – Saale-Holzland-Kreis – Saale-Orla-Kreis
Suhl – Schmalkalden-Meiningen – Hildburghausen – Sonneberg

External links
 - additional information, maps and detailed description of boundaries and changes, on the official site of the responsible branch of the German government

 
Bundestag
Germany, Bundestag
Constituencies